Stanley or Stan Taylor may refer to:

Sports
 Stan Taylor (athlete) (born 1937), British runner
Stanley Taylor (cricketer) (1875–1965), English cricketer
Stanley Taylor (boxer), opponent of Michael Marrone

Others
 Stan Taylor (barrister) (1896–1982), Australian barrister and judge
 Stan Taylor (trade unionist) (1900s–1966), British trade unionist
 Stanley Taylor (actor) (1900–1980}, American actor in films such as Red Lips (1928)
Stan Taylor, perpetrator of Russell Street bombing

See also
Stanner Taylor, actor